The Lož Karst Field, also known as the Lož Valley, is a karst field in Inner Carniola in southwest Slovenia. It is the smallest karst field in Inner Carniola.

Geography
The Lož Karst Field lies between the Bloke Plateau to the north, Mount Race to the east, and Mount Snežnik to the west.

Little Obrh Spring lies on the south edge of the karst field in Kozarišče near Snežnik Castle and is fed by water from Mount Snežnik. Big Obrh Spring lies on the east side of the karst field, near Vrhnika pri Ložu, and is fed by water from Mount Race and the Potok Plateau in the Loški Potok area. The streams from the two springs join west of Pudob to create Obrh Creek, a losing stream that disappears on the north edge of the karst field into  Golobina Cave west of Dane, emerging to the west at Lake Cerknica. Flooding affects only the western part of the karst field, below Dane, which is uninhabited. In the past, more of the karst field used to flood, and so at the end of the 19th century a lower entrance was cut into the cave, which reduced the depth and duration of flooding.

Settlements
The settlements in the Lož Karst Field are relatively large and have a clustered or linear layout. Stari Trg pri Ložu is the economic and cultural center of the area.

Economic activity
The flat areas are used for tilled fields, and lower parts near the creeks for meadows. There are also meadows and pastures along the edges of the gentler slopes, especially on the sunny sides, where animal husbandry is practiced. The wood and metal industry has developed in Stari Trg pri Ložu.

References

External links
Lož Karst Field on Geopedia

Municipality of Loška Dolina
Karst fields of Slovenia